Dactylic tetrameter is a metre in poetry. It refers to a line consisting of four dactylic feet.  "Tetrameter" simply means four poetic feet.  Each foot has a stressed syllable followed by two unstressed syllables, the opposite of an anapest, sometimes called antidactylus to reflect this fact.

Example
A dactylic foot is one stressed syllable followed by two unstressed ones:

A dactylic tetrameter would therefore be:

Scanning this using an "x" to represent an unstressed syllable and a "/" to represent a stressed syllable would make a dactylic tetrameter like the following:

The following lines from The Beatles' "Lucy in the Sky with Diamonds" demonstrate this, the scansion being:

Another example, from Browning:

See also
 Dactyl (poetry)
 Tetrameter
 Alcmanian verse, for the dactylic tetrameter in Greek and Latin poetry

References 

Types of verses